Ordizia Rugby Elkartea is a Spanish rugby union club. The club was established in 1973 and currently competes in the División de Honor de Rugby competition, the highest level of Spanish club rugby. The club is based in the town of Ordizia in the Basque region of Northern Spain. Ordizia play in red and blue colours.

Honours
División de Honor B: 1
 Champions: 2004–05
Copa del Rey: 2
 Champions: 2011–12, 2012–13
Supercopa de España: 0
 Runners-up: 2012, 2013

Squad 2012–13

International honours
  Francisco Puertas Soto
  Pedro Martín
  Matías Tudela
  Julen Goia
  Tom Parker

Season by season

19 seasons in División de Honor

See also
 Rugby union in Spain

External links
 Official website
 Spanish Rugby website

Rugby union teams in the Basque Country (autonomous community)
Rugby clubs established in 1973
Sport in Gipuzkoa
1973 establishments in Spain